Susan Notorangelo is an American long distance cyclist. She has ridden in the Race Across America five times, winning the competition in 1985 and 1989.

Susan Diane Notorangelo was born November 30, 1953, in Ferguson, Missouri, near St. Louis. Her father was Anthony Notorangelo and mother Marguerite Beiler. She is the fourth of five children and grew up in Ferguson with a love for the outdoors, gardening, and girl scouts. Today she resides in Sharon, Wisconsin, with her husband, Lon Dennis Haldeman (1958–Present). They had two daughters, Rebecca Notorangelo Haldeman (1987–Present) and Ericka Haldeman (1991-1992).

Notorangelo was the first woman to bicycle across the United States in less than 10 days. From 1982 to 1994 Notorangelo raced across the continent seven times and set five transcontinental cycling records. She rode coast to coast her first time in 1982 and set a new Women's Record of 11 days and 16 hours. She completed that event by riding the final 600 miles nonstop from Ohio to New York City and setting a new standard for long-distance racing strategy.

In 1983 and 1986 she set Tandem Transcontinental Records with her husband Lon Haldeman by crossing the country in 10 days, 20 hours (1983) and 9 days, 20 hours in 1986 which still stands as the current male/female record.

In 1985 and 1989, Notorangelo won the Women's Division of the Race Across America. Her time of 9 days, 9 hours in 1989 averaging 317 miles per day was the first time a woman had bicycled crossed the country in under ten days.

In 1983, Notorangelo set a new Women's Record in the 750-mile Paris-Brest-Paris event in France by completing the event in 53 hours.

During the next 30 years, Notorangelo would complete and set records in dozens of cycling events. She has been a motivator for thousands of cyclists she has helped ride across the United States during 100 cross-country events and tours she has organized.

Records

References

 Ultracycling: Hall of Fame

Living people
American female cyclists
1953 births
Ultra-distance cyclists
21st-century American women